David Cristian Morar (born 27 July 2004) is a Romanian professional footballer who plays as a striker for Liga I side Academica Clinceni.

Career Statistics

Club

References

External links
 

2004 births
Living people
Sportspeople from Cluj-Napoca
Romanian footballers
Association football forwards
Liga I players
LPS HD Clinceni players
FC Steaua București players